Level Cross may refer to:

Level Cross, Randolph County, North Carolina
Level Cross, Surry County, North Carolina